Miss Universe Sri Lanka (formerly known as Miss Ceylon) is a national pageant in Sri Lanka to choose ambassador for the Miss Universe pageant.

History
Miss Sri Lanka identified in 1953 with Manel Illangakoon of Colombo and became the oldest national pageant in Sri Lanka. The name of Sri Lanka previously named as British Ceylon between 1902 and 1948 then made an independence in 1948 as Ceylon. In 1953 was the first beauty pageant era in Sri Lanka by its government in Colombo. The first Miss Ceylon went to Miss World and debuted at Miss Universe in 1955 with Maureen Neliya Hingert of Colombo.

In 1973 Ceylon changed its name as Sri Lanka as permanent. Miss Sri Lanka crowned national winner to Miss Universe and also runners-up to Miss World, Miss International and Miss Asia Pacific International.

In 1997 beauty pageant in Sri Lanka had separated and did not exist at Miss Universe until 2004 where Sri Lanka had no national franchise holder in that period. Shivanthini Dharmasiri is the last Miss Sri Lanka between 1953 and 1996.

In 2005 the Miss Sri Lanka was like going back in time, with the spectacular production at the Waters Edge, where a full house sat down to watch twelve finalists vie for the title. The pageant nowadays is in under Mrs. Rosita Wickramasinghe and sponsoring in different companies per year.

National franchise holders
Miss Sri Lanka has become national franchise holder for Miss Universe, Miss International and Miss Tourism International.

Titleholders

Big Four pageants representatives

Miss Universe Sri Lanka

Miss International Sri Lanka

The 1st Runner-up of Miss Universe Sri Lanka usually represents her country at Miss International. The winner could be competed if designation allows inside by the organizer.

Minor pageants representatives
Miss Sri Lanka also crowned another title to candidates who qualified to upcoming International competitions.

Miss Tourism Sri Lanka

Miss Asia Pacific Sri Lanka

Notes

See also
 Miss World Sri Lanka
 Miss Earth Sri Lanka
 Miss Sri Lanka Online

References

External links
 Official website
 Official website of Miss Universe

Miss Universe by country
Beauty pageants in Sri Lanka
Sri Lankan awards